Jorge Herrero Arias (born 18 June 1983) is a Spanish footballer who plays for CD Rota as a midfielder.

Club career
Born in Jerez de la Frontera, Province of Cádiz, Andalusia, Herrero finished his youth career with local Xerez CD, and made his senior debut with the reserves in 2002. On 13 September 2003 he appeared in his first game as a professional, starting in a 1–1 away draw against Elche CF in the Segunda División; he finished the season with seven first-team appearances, being subsequently released.

Subsequently, Herrero resumed his career in the Segunda División B and Tercera División, representing Racing Club Portuense, Real Balompédica Linense, Jerez Industrial CF, CF Villanovense, Atlético Sanluqueño CF, San Fernando CD, Xerez Deportivo FC, UD Los Barrios and CD Rota.

Personal life
Herrero's younger brother, Bruno, was also a footballer and a midfielder. He too represented Xerez and San Fernando.

References

External links

1983 births
Living people
Spanish footballers
Footballers from Jerez de la Frontera
Association football midfielders
Segunda División players
Segunda División B players
Tercera División players
Divisiones Regionales de Fútbol players
Xerez CD B players
Xerez CD footballers
Racing Club Portuense players
Real Balompédica Linense footballers
Jerez Industrial CF players
CF Villanovense players
Atlético Sanluqueño CF players
San Fernando CD players
Xerez Deportivo FC footballers
UD Los Barrios footballers